Chloroprednisone is a topical glucocorticoid first reported in 1960.  It is a chlorinated derivative of prednisone.  The acetate ester prodrug, chloroprednisone 21-acetate, was sold under the brand name Topilan as an anti-inflammatory agent.

There is little published about chloroprednisone. This may be due to limited activity topically because the skin lacks the necessary activating enzyme 11-Beta hydroxysteroid dehydrogenase. Systemically, this agent's activity on glucocorticoid receptors may not have competed with agents like fludrocortisone or dexamethasone.

References

Chloroarenes
Diols
Glucocorticoids
Pregnanes
Triketones